Investigation Discovery (stylized and branded on-air as ID since 2008) is an American multinational pay television network dedicated to true crime documentaries owned by Warner Bros. Discovery. As of February 2015, approximately 86 million American households (74% of households with television) receive Investigation Discovery.

History 
The channel launched in 1996 under the name Discovery Civilization Network: The World History and Geography Channel. It was one of four digital cable companion networks rolled out by Discovery Communications simultaneously in October 1996. Plans for the channel had surfaced in November 1994, when its working name was "Time Traveler".

In April 2002, New York Times Television and Discovery Communications announced a joint venture to run the Discovery Civilization Channel. By then, it was available in 14 million households. The partnership aimed to complement the historical shows, with programming about current events and contemporary history.
On March 25, 2003, the channel was rebranded as Discovery Times, focusing more on the culture of the United States, as well as other miscellaneous programming. The previous name was described as "a little off-message" by executives.

In April 2006, The New York Times sold its stake in Discovery Times back to Discovery Communications, ending its ownership in the channel. Despite this, "Times" was kept in the channel's name until January 27, 2008, when Discovery Times was relaunched as Investigation Discovery (ID), oriented towards true crime programs.

In 2016, owing to a resurgence in popularity within the true crime genre, ID was the second-highest-rated cable network among women 25–54. In 2018, ID was the sixth-highest-rated basic cable network in full-day viewership.

On April 12, 2020, Investigation Discovery introduced a new logo, placing a greater focus on the "ID" acronym to make it better-suited for multi-platform use.

In December 2022, the team responsible for ID also took over responsibility for HLN (formerly CNN Headline News), which became a sibling channel following the merger that formed Warner Bros. Discovery earlier that year. That channel had gradually shifted to a similar true crime-focused format since the mid-2010s, dropping its last original news programs at the same time as the management change, and had already begun airing repeats of ID programming such as Hometown Homicide shortly after the WBD merger.

Programming

Most of ID's programs are original productions, but it also airs re-titled off-network reruns, including ABC's 20/20, CBS' 48 Hours, and NBC’s Dateline.

ID's longest-running series is On the Case with Paula Zahn which debuted in 2009. Other long-running shows on the network include Disappeared and Homicide Hunter: Lt. Joe Kenda.

On June 7, 2015, ID aired its first ever scripted mini-series; Serial Thriller: Angel of Decay chronicled the investigation of convicted (and later executed) serial killer Ted Bundy. A second installment, Serial Thriller: The Chameleon, premiered as a two-part miniseries in December 2015, chronicling the crimes that resulted in the execution of American serial killer Stephen Morin. A third installment, Serial Thriller: The Headhunter, about serial killer Edmund Kemper (which possibly includes the story of serial killer Herbert Mullin), premiered on February 20, 2016.

International versions
 Canada
 Europe
 Latin America
 India (Asia Pacific) (Closed on February 1, 2018, relaunched on January 13, 2020)
 Australia and New Zealand
 France (as Discovery Investigation)
 Russia (Closed on March 9, 2022)
South Africa
Vietnam (2005-2007)

References

External links

 
English-language television stations in the United States
Television channels and stations established in 1996
Warner Bros. Discovery networks
1996 establishments in Maryland
Television networks in the United States